The 2005 12 Hours of Sebring was the 53rd running of this event, and took place on March 19, 2005.  The race was sponsored by Mobil 1 and was the opening race of the 2005 American Le Mans Series season run by IMSA.

Official results

Class winners in bold.  Cars failing to complete 70% of winner's distance marked as Not Classified (NC).

Statistics
 Pole Position - #1 ADT Champion Racing - Grid set by combined practice times
 Fastest Lap - #1 ADT Champion Racing - 1:48.580
 Distance - 
 Average Speed -

External links
 

Sebring
12 Hours of Sebring
12 Hours of Sebring
12 Hours Of Sebring
12 Hours Of Sebring